James Lee Arrell (November 7, 1888 – March 26, 1955) was an American rugby union player who played prop for the United States men's national team in its first capped match in 1912.

Biography
Arrell was born on November 7, 1888 in Wyandotte, Kansas, the son of Happer Samuel Arrell and Mary Eva Arrell (born Ege). Arrell attended Stanford University beginning in 1910, where he played in the front row for the school's rugby team, ending the 1910 season with a record of seven wins and one loss. While at Stanford, Arrell became a member of the Lambda Sigma chapter of the Beta Theta Pi fraternity.

On November 16, 1912, Arrell played for the United States national rugby union team at prop in its first capped match against Australia, a 12–8 loss. This would be his only appearance for the United States in a test match. In 1913, Arrell would also play rugby for Olympic Club in San Francisco, California. Arrell married Annie M. Holderman, and was the father of seven children. He moved to Abeline, Texas in 1930 and lived there until his death on March 26, 1955, at the age of 66.

References

External links
 

1888 births
1955 deaths
American rugby union players
United States international rugby union players
Rugby union props